The Magnificent 7 is a collaborative album combining Motown's premier vocal groups, The Supremes and The Four Tops. Issued by Motown in 1970, it followed two collaborative albums The Supremes did with The Temptations in the late 1960s. The album featured their hit cover of Ike & Tina Turner's "River Deep – Mountain High", which reached number 14 on the US Billboard Hot 100 singles chart. In the UK, the album peaked at number 6. In December 1971, Billboard reported UK album sales of 30,000 copies.

Apart from "Knock on My Door" (written by Patti Jerome and Joe Hinton), the tracks on the LP are covers of rock and soul songs, including the duet by Dinah Washington and Brook Benton "Baby (You've Got What It Takes)", Bobby Scott's "A Taste of Honey", Sly & the Family Stone's "Everyday People", Ed Townsend's "For Your Love" and Laura Nyro's "Stoned Soul Picnic", as well as hits by other Motown artists: the Tops' own "Without the One You Love (Life's Not Worth While)", the duet "Ain't Nothing Like the Real Thing" by Marvin Gaye and Tammi Terrell, Gaye's and Kim Weston's "It's Got to Be a Miracle (This Thing Called Love)", The Spinners' "Together We Can Make Such Sweet Music" and former Supremes' bandmate Diana Ross' 1970 debut solo single, "Reach Out and Touch (Somebody's Hand)".

"River Deep - Mountain High" was released as a single in the Netherlands, with "Knock on My Door" on the flip side. Two more singles were issued in the United Kingdom in 1972: "Without the One You Love" with "Let's Make Love Now" on the B side; and "Reach Out and Touch (Somebody's Hand)" backed by "Where Would I Be Without You, Baby".

Critical reception

Cashbox published, 'The Supremes and Four Tops have been making music for a long time, but never as a single group. Now, for the first time, the two super groups unite to deliver what must be called the most soulful and energetic package of the year. Their voices and musical styles blend together as if they have always been a part of the same group. "Knock On My Door," "For Your Love," "Reach Out And Touch (somebody's hand)," "Everyday People," and "Together We Can Make Such Sweet Music," are only a few of the cuts that will make this classic LP a chart topper.'

Track listing
Side one
"Knock on My Door" (Joe Hinton, Patti Jerome) - 2:15
"For Your Love" (Ed Townsend) - 2:54
"Without the One You Love" (Lamont Dozier, Brian Holland) - 3:10
"Reach Out and Touch (Somebody's Hand)" (Nickolas Ashford, Valerie Simpson) - 4:20
"Stoned Soul Picnic" (Laura Nyro) - 3:10
"Baby (You've Got What It Takes)" (Clyde Otis, Murray Stein) - 2:59

Side two
"River Deep – Mountain High" (Jeff Barry, Ellie Greenwich, Phil Spector) - 4:52
"Ain't Nothing Like the Real Thing" (Nickolas Ashford, Valerie Simpson) - 2:29
"Everyday People" (Sylvester Stewart) - 2:52
"It's Got to Be a Miracle (This Thing Called Love)" (Vernon Bullock, Sylvia Moy, William "Mickey" Stevenson) - 3:55
"Taste of Honey" (Ric Marlow, Bobby Scott) - 2:57
"Together We Can Make Such Sweet Music" (Martin Coleman, Richard Drapkin) - 2:59

Personnel
The Supremes
Jean Terrell - vocals
Mary Wilson - vocals
Cindy Birdsong - vocals
The Four Tops 
Levi Stubbs - vocals
Abdul "Duke" Fakir - vocals
Lawrence Payton - vocals
Renaldo "Obie" Benson - vocals
Technical
Frank Wilson - executive producer
Duke Browner - producer (tracks 1A, 2A, 5B, 6B)
Clay McMurray - producer (tracks 3A, 6A, 3B, 4B)
Nickolas Ashford - producer (tracks 4A, 5A, 1B, 2B)
Valerie Simpson - producer (tracks 4A, 5A, 1B, 2B)
The Funk Brothers - instrumentation
David Van DePitte, Paul Riser - arrangers

Chart history

References

1970 albums
The Supremes albums
Four Tops albums
Collaborative albums
Covers albums
Albums arranged by Paul Riser
Albums produced by Frank Wilson (musician)
Albums produced by Ashford & Simpson
Motown albums